Peter Casey (born 1957) is an Irish entrepreneur, television personality and political candidate.

Peter Casey may also refer to:
 Peter Casey (horse trainer) (c. 1935–2018), Irish horse trainer
 Peter Casey (screenwriter) (born 1950), American television producer and screenwriter
 Peter Casey (hurler) (born 1997), Irish hurler

See also
 Pete Casey (1895–1976), American football player